The Unrecoupable One Man Bandit – Volume One is an album by English singer Boy George, released in 1998. The album's ten tracks were recorded in 1996 and were intended to be included on a follow-up to George's 1995 album Cheapness and Beauty, but it was shelved. The tracks were finally released in 1998 due to popular demand from fans and are presented on the album in demo form, mixed and not fully mixed.

The album includes "She Was Never He", a song that was first performed on late night BBC show Gaytime TV in 1995, as well as a cover version of David Bowie's "Suffragette City".

Critical reception

In a review for AllMusic, Ned Raggett gave The Unrecoupable One Man Bandit three out of five stars, describing the album as "an enjoyable romp through a variety of fun rockers, some more pointedly tongue in cheek than others."

Track listing
All songs written by George O'Dowd and John Themis, unless otherwise stated.

Personnel
Adapted from AllMusic.

Peter Adams – keyboards
Sian Bell – cello
Winston Blissett – bass
Boy George – primary artist, vocals
Alan Branch – engineer
Cheeky Paul – editing
Chris Davis – saxophone
Snake Davis – saxophone
Linda Duggan – background vocals
Wilhelm Finger – sleeve art
Kevan Frost – background vocals
Eve Gallagher – vocals
Mitt Gammon – harmonica
Simon Gardner – flugelhorn, trumpet
Haxwood Herbert – bagpipes
Sally Herbert – violin
Alan Jenkins – engineer
Julian Mendelsohn – mixing
Mary Pearse – background vocals
Jocelyn Pook – viola
André Scillag – original photography, photography
Jonathan Shorten – keyboards
J. Neil Sidwell – trombone
Richard Sidwell – flugelhorn, trumpet
Sonia Slany – violin
Richie Stevens	– drums
John Themis – guitar, mixing, producer, background vocals
Salvatore Vada	– illustrations
Zee – background vocals

References

External links
The Unrecoupable One Man Bandit at Discogs

1999 albums
Boy George albums
Demo albums